Warren Stowell (born November 6, 1941) was an American businessman, teacher, and politician.

Stowell was born in Albert Lea, Minnesota and graduated from Austin High School in Austin, Minnesota. He served in the United States Navy from 1960 to 1964. Stowell received his associate of arts degree from Austin Associate College and his bachelor's degree in history and education from Winona State University. Stowell lived in Lewiston, Minnesota with his wife and family and taught in the Lewiston Public Schools. He was also involved with the building supplies business. Stowell served in the Minnesota House of Representatives from 1979 to 1982 and was a Republican.

References

1941 births
Living people
People from Albert Lea, Minnesota
People from Winona County, Minnesota
Military personnel from Minnesota
Winona State University alumni
Businesspeople from Minnesota
Schoolteachers from Minnesota
Republican Party members of the Minnesota House of Representatives